X2: Wolverine's Revenge (released as X-Men 2: Wolverine's Revenge in Europe and Australia; originally known as X-Men: Wolverine's Revenge during E3 2002) is an action beat'em up video game based on Marvel Comics character Wolverine, a member of the mutant team X-Men, developed by British game developer GenePool Software and published by Activision for PlayStation 2, GameCube, and Xbox with the former developed by Warthog Games alongside GenePool and ported to Windows by LTI Gray Matter. It was released on April 15, 2003, to coincide with the release of the film X2: X-Men United, which itself is a sequel to the 2000 film X-Men. The Game Boy Advance version developed by Vicarious Visions was re-released on a Twin Pack cartridge and bundled with Spider-Man: Mysterio's Menace in 2005.

In X2: Wolverine's Revenge, the player helps Wolverine fight his way past the heavily guarded areas of the Weapon X Facility to piece together fragmented clues to Wolverine's murky past and to save his life. Wolverine has 48 hours to find an antidote to the deadly Shiva Virus circulating in his bloodstream and the clues point to the Weapon X facility, the Canadian fortress where he had his skeletal structure fused with adamantium.

A significant feature has Mark Hamill providing the voice-over for Wolverine in game. While Hugh Jackman's likeness is on the cover and promotional material, the character model in game is based on the comic books. Patrick Stewart reprises his film role as Professor X in game.

The game received generally mixed reviews upon release. Critics praised the voice acting, especially of Hamill and Stewart, the intriguing plot, and unlockables, but criticized the slow combat, lack of mid-level checkpoints, and for being too hard and requiring too many retries.

Gameplay 
Similar to Spider-Man with stealth system inspired by Metal Gear Solid, Wolverine's Revenge is an action game played from a third-person perspective spread across six acts. Playing as Wolverine, the player can retract or extend his adamantium claws, punch, kick, and slide tackle to fight various armored soldiers and mutant creatures. The player can earn points by performing Strikes, where Wolverine stylishly attacks his surrounding enemies, and can also earn a "Bowling bonus" by stunning an enemy with claws retracted or a kick, picking them up and throwing them into another enemy. Strike moves can also be used to finish off stunned enemies.

The player can also use Wolverine's heightened senses by pressing and holding a specific button. At this moment, the screen (except for Wolverine and the enemies) turns into an orange tint and allows the player to see foot prints of an enemy, his position (indicated by a pulsating red arrow above him), his green scent trails, lasers, a ghost of Wolverine about to take him down, and invisible mines, indicated by large spinning circles on the ground, as well as illuminating dark areas. Using the senses also puts the player into a stealth mode where Wolverine can sneak up behind an unsuspecting enemy and instantly kill them, rewarding them with dog tags, which when a certain amount is collected, grants the player access to more damaging Strikes. He can also hug walls to kill any enemies lurking around corners. The player can also earn tags by performing Triple Strikes.

Another mechanic is Wolverine's feral rage. Whenever he damages an enemy or he himself gets damaged by an enemy, his rage meter gradually fills up. When full, or if the player double taps the claw extension button when any red of the meter is showing, Wolverine enters a temporary rage, where he moves faster and kills enemies quicker for a limited amount of time. The player can also trigger Wolverine's healing ability by retracting his claws, at the cost of being able to destroy destructible objects or slash open fences.

Each of the game's acts culminates with a boss fight between one of Wolverine's archenemies including Sabretooth (who is fought twice), Magneto, Wendigo, Lady Deathstrike, and Juggernaut. They often involve using specific Strike moves on them (ex. Wolverine grabs Wendigo's tail and throws him, and Wolverine leaps on Juggernaut's head to attack him), avoiding their attacks and finding an opening. Throughout the game, Professor X assists the player with his telepathy, often giving hints and advice.

There are also collectables scattered throughout the game. Comic books unlock alternate outfits for Wolverine, including his classic blue and yellow outfit, his Ultimate X-Men outfit, a prototype outfit designed by Alex Ross and the uniform depicted in the X-Men films. Cerebro files unlock character model viewers, with Patrick Stewart narrating the character's backstories. The player can also find collectables to fill the health and rage meters quicker.

Plot 

The story begins in 1968. Logan (Mark Hamill) is walking along a backstreet, when behind him come some agents from the Weapon X program. They try to capture Logan so they can take him to the Weapon X facility. Logan tries to defend himself, but he is tranquilized. Logan is taken to the Facility and subjected to the adamantium bonding process. Soon after, he escapes from the experiment chamber and tries to get outside. The Professor (Don Morrow) calls him an animal, which enrages Logan and helps him escape the Professor's control. Logan tries to get to The Professor to confront him but he is stopped by Sabretooth (Fred Tatasciore). He defeats Sabretooth and he confronts The Professor while telling Dr. Abraham Cornelius (Don Morrow) and Dr. Carol Hines (Jennifer Hale) to take their leave. When Weapon X restrains him at claw-point, The Professor reveals that all Weapon X subjects were implanted with a dormant and deadly virus known as the "Shiva Strain" as a failsafe. The Professor also reveals that the virus would kill a normal human in one year but has no idea how long the virus would kill a human mutant.

Later in the present, Logan, who now goes by "Wolverine", is now a member of the X-Men and he has told Beast (Richard Portnow) what he remembers of his past. Beast tells Wolverine that the Shiva Virus has bypassed his healing factor and will kill him in two days if the cure is not found (ironically, which is on Logan's birthday). Professor X (Patrick Stewart) tells Wolverine to try to find the cure in the Weapon X Facility while Beast provides Wolverine with an implanted wristwatch telling him how much time he has left. After being flown to Edmonton by Cyclops and Jean Grey, Wolverine uses a private plane flown by a female pilot (Mayim Bialik) to get to the Weapon X Facility. However, the plane is shot down. He survives the plane crash and starts making his way towards the Weapon X facility.

Wolverine fights his way to a cavern where the spirit of the Wendigo lives. Wolverine fights with Wendigo and wins. Wendigo gets up and throws Logan out of the cavern where he lands on snow. Logan sees a Weapon X truck and jumps on it. Logan reaches the Weapon X Facility and sneaks in. On the way in, he is ambushed by a group of GIs. The sound of gunfire starts and Wolverine is surprised that he is not shot. He then sees another GI who shot down the ambushers. When Wolverine asks him why he let him live by asking "Am I supposed to thank you, or are you just a lousy shot?", the GI states, "Lets just say it's not your time to die...yet". Wolverine examines him a moment and he asks "You're not quite human, are you?" To which the GI states, "You should talk". As he walks away. After fighting through the base, he accesses a database and finds that the Weapon X scientists are at the Void (a maximum security mutant detention center that's similar to the Vault) so he makes his way there. Leaving, he is attacked by Sabretooth again. Sabretooth is defeated and grudgingly gives Wolverine the Part B of the virus cure after stating that he knew about the Shiva Virus a long time ago.

Later, Logan goes to The Void where he sees Colossus (Ted Nordblum) who lets him enter the facility after he was informed by Professor X about Logan's condition. While Logan is fighting his way on the Facility, Sabretooth comes to the Void and takes out some of its security on his way to get to the Weapon X scientists. Sabretooth then releases Alpha-Class mutants Omega Red, Magneto, and Juggernaut from their prisons. Meanwhile, Logan finds Dr. Abraham Cornelius and Dr. Carol Hines. Abraham Cornelius gives Logan the formula of Part A of the cure. Due to the Void blocking Logan's contact with Professor X, he ends up having to head outside to relay the info to him. Upon leaving, he warns Abraham Cornelius and Carol Hines that Sabretooth is also looking for them. However, when Logan reaches the roof, he is faced by Juggernaut (Fred Tatasciore). When Logan defeats him, Colossus tells Wolverine that Magneto and Omega Red were the other two Alpha-Class mutants that were freed. As Colossus drags the unconscious Juggernaut back to his cell, he points to the device that will help Logan get out. Logan destroys the Void Shield and relays the info of the Part A cure to Professor X after being told that Beast has synthesized the Part B of the Shiva Virus cure. Logan then heads out to find and defeat Magneto after Professor X detects magnetic signatures.

After Logan escapes, May Deuce (Mayim Bialik) the Mutant Hunter Boss comes to the Void to lead the Mutant Hunters into hunting down Wolverine and the other escaped mutants. While looking for Magneto, Logan is contacted by Professor X stating that the Magnetic Flux Limiter Collar on him has suppressed Magneto's magnetic powers long enough for him to become more powerful. Logan comes across a ruined highway and uses a motorcycle which he rides into a ruined town. Logan manages to find Magneto (Fred Tatasciore) in a steel mill. Logan tries to stop Magneto's moves, but he has to kill all the Mutant Hunters at the same time. Logan defeats Magneto and knocks him unconscious. Upon being told by Professor X that too much magnetic interference is preventing Rogue from homing in on him, Logan then makes his way to the city leaving Magneto for any Mutant Hunters sent from the Void.

When Logan is heading to the city to meet up with Rogue, a helicopter comes to him. In the helicopter is May Deuce. She thanks Logan because he defeated Magneto and offers to take him to the top of the Xenon Building. But when the helicopter reaches the top of a building, May Deuce throws Wolverine on the roof. Logan sees Lady Deathstrike (Gwendoline Yeo) and he realizes that the pilot, the Army GI, and May Deuce were some of Lady Deathstrike's robots who were to direct Wolverine to her so she could kill him. She also revealed that she paid Sabretooth to cause him pain. Wolverine defeats Lady Deathstrike and reaches a helicopter land platform where she follows him. Logan throws Lady Deathstrike off the roof and Rogue comes with the virus cure. Wolverine drinks it and goes home. Sabretooth finds Lady Deathstrike. He takes a vial from her and drinks it (most likely the cure for the virus), takes her, and leaves.

Meanwhile, Apocalypse (Christopher Corey Smith) and Mister Sinister (also Christopher Corey Smith) watch every move from Wolverine as they prepare their Horsemen of Apocalypse.

Wolverine lies on his bed and then suddenly realizes that he has not found and defeated Omega Red upon remembering the escaped mutants that Colossus told him about.

Deleted scene 
In all versions (except for the Game Boy Advance version) if the player collects all dog tags, a deleted scene is unlocked. As Wolverine visits a ruined town to find and defeat Magneto, he is stalked by a shadowy figure. As the figure gets close, Wolverine nearly kills the figure who is revealed to be Spider-Man (Rino Romano). When Wolverine states that Spider-Man is off his home turf, Spider-Man sarcastically explains that he heard about the big breakout down at the Void and rode a charter bus with other superheroes who could not fly or teleport. When Spider-Man asks if Wolverine needs help battling Magneto, Wolverine tells him to deal with the chaos until Damage Control arrives as he goes to battle Magneto.

Development 
Before the game's announcement at E3 2002, then-new Liverpool-based studio GenePool Software was developing a game based on the long-running New X-Men comic book series titled Weapon X. It was planned to follow Wolverine's origin story which features his first encounter with his former friend-turned-rival and arch-enemy Sabretooth. The game was announced at E3 2002 by publisher Activision as X-Men: Wolverine's Revenge with no relation to the 2003 film X2. However, shortly before X2 release, the game's title was renamed as X2: Wolverine's Revenge for release to tie-in with the film's release. Despite this, it featured an original story by famed comic book writer Larry Hama, and does not take place in the continuity of the film series, but had a closer resemblance to the Marvel Universe instead.

Reception 

X2: Wolverine's Revenge was met with average to mixed reviews upon release. GameRankings gave it a score of 67.25% for the GameCube version; 61.79% for the PlayStation 2 version; 76.67% for the GBA version; 60.83% for the PC version; and 65.07% for the Xbox version. Likewise, Metacritic gave it a score of 62 out of 100 for the GameCube version; 58 out of 100 each for the PS2 and Xbox versions; 72 out of 100 for the GBA version; and 55 out of 100 for the PC version.

Common criticisms include clunky and alienating stealth mechanics, bland visuals, lack of checkpoints, and high and unforgiving difficulty, making the game unfairly hard. Official UK PlayStation 2 Magazine gave the game 7 out of 10, describing it as follows: "a quality action adventure that blends stealth with hand-to-hand combat. Only a few irritations deny this a higher score". Of the said irritations, the most prominently criticized element was the lack of mid-mission checkpoints, forcing players to replay large sections upon death. Maxim gave the game a score of eight out of ten and said, "while most of Revenge’s game play involves turning bad guys into kebab, the game’s strict homage to the comic gives it more depth". The Village Voice gave the Xbox version a score of seven out of ten and said, "deploying your special powers is motivation enough to move through the game's booby-trapped military complexes, crash sites, mines, caves, and places that look like mines or caves". The Cincinnati Enquirer also gave it three-and-a-half stars out of five and stated that "controlling Wolverine during combat can prove difficult, especially when there are multiple enemies onscreen simultaneously". However, Entertainment Weekly gave it a C− and stated that "the pacing is sluggish, the gameplay irritating, and ultimately it feels like Wolverine is exacting revenge on the wrong person: the player".

References

External links
Warthog Sweden/42-Bit AB page

2003 video games
Activision games
Action video games
Game Boy Advance games
GameCube games
PlayStation 2 games
Stealth video games
Video games based on films
Video games based on X-Men films
Video games based on adaptations
Video games based on works by Michael Dougherty
Video games developed in the United Kingdom
Video games set in Canada
Windows games
Wolverine (comics) video games
Xbox games
Aspyr games
Superhero video games
Video games based on works by Dan Harris (screenwriter)
Single-player video games
Vicarious Visions games